"Don't You Know" is a song by Swedish artist Pandora. It was released in February 1995 as the second single from Pandora's second studio album, Tell the World (1995).

The song peaked at number 7 on the Swedish charts and number one in  Finland.

Track listing
Swedish CD single
"Don't You Know" (Radio Edit) – 3:49
"Don't You Know" (The Sir Family Extended Mix) – 6:24

Swedish CD maxi single
"Don't You Know" (Radio Edit) – 3:49
"Don't You Know" (The Sir Family Extended Mix) – 6:24
"Don't You Know" (Peka P's Alternative Edit) – 5:35
"Don't You Know" (Huma's Typhoon Edit) – 6:54

Swedish 12-inch single
A1. "Don't You Know" (The Sir Family Extended Mix) – 6:24
B1. "Don't You Know" (Peka P's Alternative Edit) – 5:35
B2. "Don't You Know" (Radio Edit) – 3:49

German CD maxi single
"Don't You Know" (Original Radio Edit) – 3:50
"Don't You Know" (Clock's "Ten To Two" Radio Mix) – 3:22
"Don't You Know" (Primax NRG Mix) – 5:29
"Don't You Know" (Man City Vocal Mix) – 6:54
"Don't You Know" (Primax V.E. Day Mix) – 4:53
"Don't You Know" (The Sir Family Extended Mix) – 6:17
"Don't You Know" (Clock's "Ten To Two" Mix) – 5:16
"Don't You Know" (Overworld Dub) – 5:29

Charts

Weekly charts

Year-end charts

Release history

United DJ's vs. Pandora remix

In 2006, "Don't You Know" was remixed and re-released by United DJs vs. Pandora. The song was released on 17 January 2007 as the second single from United DJs vs. Pandora's album, Celebration (2007).

The song reached the top of the Swedish Singles Chart on 25 January 2007 staying one week at the top, 3 weeks in Top 5 and 20 weeks in total in the Swedish charts. It also peaked at number 4 in the Finnish charts.

Track listing
Swedish and Finnish CD single (2007)
"Don't You Know" (Soundcruiser's Radio Mix) – 3:45
"Don't You Know" (Soundcruiser's Extended) – 5:48

Remixes
"Don't You Know" (Magic Mitch & DJ Nico Extended Mix) - 7:22
"Don't You Know" (Soundcruisers Extended Mix) - 5:48
"Don't You Know" (The Chuck Norris Experiment) - 3:58
"Don't You Know" (Groove Factory Mix) - 4:18
"Don't You Know" (Magic Mitch & DJ Nico Radio Mix) - 4:11
"Don't You Know" (Soundcruisers Radio Mix) - 3:44
"Don't You Know" (R-Spec Trance Mix) - 6:27

Charts

See also
 List of number-one singles of 1995 (Finland)
 List of number-one singles of 2007 (Sweden)

References

1995 songs
1995 singles
2007 singles
Pandora (singer) songs
EMI Records singles
Virgin Records singles
Number-one singles in Finland
Number-one singles in Sweden